Panegialios ( (Panegialios Gymnastics Club, referring to Aigialeia, a subprefecture covering the northeastern part of Achaea) is a football club based in Aigio, Greece. Panegialios has a long tradition in Greek football championships and has several appearances in the Greek Super League (former A' Ethniki), 2nd Division and 3rd Division. Additionally the team has reached twice the semi-finals of the Greek Cup competition. Panegialios is one of the most successful and popular teams in Achaea and Peloponnese.

History
The club was founded on 25 February 1927 in Egio by local selected community members. The man who inspired the idea of the formation of a football club in Egio was Zisimos Livas. Livas, a well-known architect, together with Nick Gardeniotis, C. Sakellaropoulos, Ir. Anastasopoulos, K. Eliopoulos, K. Liritzis, Chr. Papandianos, etc. have established Panegialios G.S. It is worth to mention that the effort for the formation of a football club in Egio had begun from Livas in 1924. Until 1927 Livas and the other co-founders have raised money in order to establish the club. Finally in February 1927 they submitted the statute foundation of the club to the local judicial authorities.

Nicknames 
Panegialios nickname since the late-1950s was Mavri Thiella (Black Storm). Also his players called Pasades tou Aigiou because they were very well paid for that era.

Greek cup 
Panegialios has a big tradition in Greek Cup and twice reached the semi finals, in 1959 and 1981. Both has lost the qualification in the final from Olympiacos Piraeus. Additionally the club has reached the quarter finals twice.

Crest and colours
Like most old football clubs, Panegialios did not initially have any badge displayed on their shirts. The club's crest depicts two wrestlers of Greco-Roman wrestling. It is quite unusual for a football club to have a crest that refers to wrestling but the explanation has to do with Panegialios founder, Zisimos Livas. Livas was a lover Greco-Roman wrestling and had been an athlete of wrestling in Panellinios G.S. So in 1954 after the death of Zisimos Livas, the President of the Club Sotirios Panagiotopoulos in order to honor him, has decided to adopt the club the two wrestlers as a crest.
The colours of the team are black and white since 1927.

Stadium
Panegialios home ground is Aeghio Municipal (formerly "National") Stadium which has two stands along the sides of the pitch. The stadium has two almost identical stands, with electronic projectors, a modern canteen as well as a café. The stadium was inaugurated on April 29, 1949. In this location the stadium was formerly a football stadium, with no stands and surrounding arenas and other infrastructure, which was the seat of Panegyalos since its foundation in 1927. In 1983, it was placed on turf and 2011 plastic coating on the arena that surrounds the pitch of the football field. The stadium also had two similar small petals that raised the capacity of over 11,000 spectators. The petals were demolished during its refurbishment in 1985 except for a small section double of the western platform.

The record at the stage was 1963 in a match for the First National Division (Alpha Ethniki), between Panegialios and Olympiacos, with 14,119 spectators.

Supporters
Panegialios F.C. has always had loyal supporters. The first fan club was created during the 1970s. It was called Sindesmos Filathlon Aigiou (S.F.A.) and later changed in Sindesmos Filathlon Panaigialeiou. In 2006 Bianconeri Club has established with strong presence in Panaigialios matches until nowadays.

League divisions

League appearances 
Panegialos league appearances in national divisions since 1958-59. It is one of the few clubs that has participated in all four national Greek divisions.
 Alpha Ethniki - 7 appearances
 Beta Ethniki - 21 appearances 
 Gamma Ethniki - 17 appearances 
 Delta Ethniki - 15 appearances

National
2012–13: Gamma Ethniki (Third division) (South Group) 1st
2013–14: Football League (South Group): 5th
2014–15: Football League (South Group): 6th
2015–16: Football League: 12th
2016–17: Football League:  8th
2017–18: Football League: 16th
2018–19: Gamma Ethniki (Third division) 12th

Notable players

Sergio Espinosa
 Kristen Viikmäe
 Nikos Alefantos
 Savvas Papazoglou
 Grigoris Aganian
 Lakis Sofianos
 Nikos Karamanlis
 Kostas Davourlis
 Michalis Kritikopoulos
 Armando Goufas

Honours

Domestic competitions
Greek FCA Winners' Championship
Winners (1): 1961–62
 Football League
 Winners (1):  1980-81
 Gamma Ethniki
 Winners (2): 1978-79, 2012-13
 Delta Ethniki
 Winners (6): 1992-93, 1994-95, 2006-07, 2008-09, 2011-12
 Achaea FCA Championship
 Winners (5): 1968-69, 1975-76, 1976-77, 1988-89, 2019-20
 Achaea FCA Cup
 Winners (4): 1936-37, 1993-94, 2006-07, 2008-09
 Achaea FCA Super Cup
 Winners (1): 2007

References

External links
Official website

 
Aigio
Association football clubs established in 1927
Football clubs in Western Greece
1927 establishments in Greece
Gamma Ethniki clubs